The York–Durham Heritage Railway is a heritage railway in both the York Region and the Durham Region of Ontario, Canada, north of Toronto.

The railway operates excursion trains over a  route between the historic towns of Stouffville and Uxbridge.  The round trip takes approximately 2 hours and 30 minutes.

The railway runs on the tracks of the former Toronto and Nipissing Railway.  Metrolinx owns and operates the line south from Stouffville GO Station as the Stouffville line.

Operations
The York–Durham Heritage Railway operates non-stop between the Uxbridge Station on the Metrolinx Uxbridge Subdivision and Stouffville GO Station. Between Old Elm GO Station and Stouffville, trains operate over the same tracks as the GO Transit Stouffville line commuter rail service.

The railway runs on occasion between the Old Unionville Station and the Markham GO Station, as it did in June 2018. Neither station serves this run with the former's platform fenced off from the tracks.

Trains are scheduled on weekends from June through mid-October, and are pulled by an Alco RS-11 diesel locomotive, #3612, which was built for the Duluth, Winnipeg & Pacific Railway in 1956. Coaches include both vintage heavyweights built in the 1910s and 1920s, and lightweight cars from 1954.

The railway cars are stored at an open rail yard on Railway Street/King Street West in Uxbridge, Ontario. Several railway sheds are on the yard. The most significant is the Uxbridge Station, built in 1904.

The YDHR is operated entirely by volunteers of the York–Durham Heritage Railway Association.

Railway History

The Uxbridge Subdivision was built in 1871 as the Toronto and Nipissing Railway, a  narrow-gauge line.  The line was converted to  shortly after being acquired by the Midland Railway in 1882.  Following a series of mergers and acquisitions, the line became part of the Canadian National Railway (CN) in 1923.

In the 1980s, CN began to abandon the line.  Tracks north of Uxbridge were lifted, but the line south of Uxbridge was purchased by GO Transit (now Metrolinx) to preserve it for possible Uxbridge - Toronto commuter rail service.  Until such a service is introduced, the York-Durham Railway is the sole operator north of Lincolnville station.

Rolling stock

Locomotives
 1951 MLW RS-3 #1310
 1955 MLW RS-3 #22
 1956 ALCO RS-11 #3612

Passenger Cars
 1919 Pullman Company Colonist sleeper #4960
 1930 CCF Solarium/Lounge car #15041, (ex-CNR)
 1950s Coaches # 3233, 3209 (ex-CNR)
 1955 Budd coaches #101 - #106, converted from Rail Diesel Cars to coaches in 2008.

Non-passenger cars
 1919 National Steel Car boxcar #406308 (ex-CNR)
 1950 CCF flatcar #662339 (ex-CNR)
 1953 caboose #434908 (ex-CPR)
 1957 National Steel Car Baggage car #9636
 hopper car #165 (ex-Green Bay and Western Railway)
 3 track inspection cars

See also

List of heritage railways in Canada
 Narrow gauge railways in Ontario
 List of Ontario railways
 Rail transport in Ontario

References

Further reading

External links
York-Durham Heritage Railway
YDHR Facebook Page.
YDHR YouTube Page.

Heritage railways in Ontario
Standard gauge railways in Canada
1868 establishments in Ontario